Zaxoi is a small town and township in Maizhokunggar County the Lhasa Prefecture in the Tibet Autonomous Region of China.

See also
List of towns and villages in Tibet

Populated places in Lhasa
Township-level divisions of Tibet
Maizhokunggar County